Moshe Glam (born 28 November 1968) is an Israeli footballer and a football manager.

With five seasons in Beitar Netanya, three seasons in Maccabi Netanya and one season in Maccabi HaSharon Netanya Glam made history as the only player to take part in all of the senior sides from the city of Netanya.

Honours
 Israeli Premier League: 1993–94
 Toto Cup: 1993–94, 1998–99
 Israel State Cup: 1995

Personal life
Glam's younger brother is Rami Glam.

External links

Stats at Maccabi Haifa's official website 
Interview with Glam at NRG 

1970 births
Living people
Israeli Jews
Israeli footballers
Israel international footballers
Maccabi Netanya F.C. players
Maccabi Haifa F.C. players
Maccabi Tel Aviv F.C. players
F.C. Ashdod players
Maccabi Ramat Amidar F.C. players
Maccabi Ahi Nazareth F.C. players
Maccabi Ironi Kfar Yona F.C. players
Liga Leumit players
Israeli Premier League players
Footballers from Netanya
Israeli people of Libyan-Jewish descent
Association football midfielders